Scugnizzi is a 1989 Italian musical drama, directed by Nanni Loy. The film is also called "Street Kids" in the American market.

Plot
Fortunato Assante (Leo Gullotta) is an out work/out of money actor.  He agrees to take a job teaching drama at a reform school.  After some hesitation he realizes the potential and ability of various students, and has pity for the lives these kids have lived on the streets.

Cast
Leo Gullotta as Fortunato Assante
Pino Ammendola as Salvatore
Francesco Allocca as Kid
Sara Basile as Iodice
 Pino Caruso as the judge 
 Tosca D'Aquino as	Teresa        
 Aldo Giuffrè	as  Don Nicola              
 Bardia King	as Brono
 Marco Leonardi	as Salvatore        
 Lina Polito	as     Mrs. Lanzetta

Awards

References

External links 

1989 films
1980s Italian-language films
Italian musical drama films
Films directed by Nanni Loy
1980s musical drama films
1989 drama films
1980s Italian films